Rob Riggle's Ski Master Academy is an American comedy streaming television series starring Rob Riggle that premiered on August 23, 2018 on Crackle.

Premise
Rob Riggle's Ski Master Academy follows Rob Riggle, "who is mostly known for his legendary ski master movies, has invested all of his money and reputation into an Academy celebrating America’s truest art form – personal watercraft riding. Rob, his legendary stunt man commandant Dirk Hamsteak and their entire staff of instructors spend a semester defending their beloved Academy at all costs. No matter how many people criticize it...go missing...or die!"

Cast and characters

Main
 Dave (Gruber) Allen as Gil
 Britt Baron as Brit Brit Hamsteak
 Eliza Coupe as Preggers
 Samm Levine as Jeb
 Rizwan Manji as Todd
 Billy Merritt as Dirk Hamsteak
 Alison Rich as Chandler
 Carl Tart as Chauncy
 Rob Riggle as himself

Recurring
 Paul Scheer as Gary
 Brian Urlacher as himself
 Tim Meadows as Lake Commissioner
 Dermot Mulroney as himself
 Christopher McDonald as Jim Bassman
 Jamie Chung as Ghost Skier
 Beth Dover as C.A.R.O.L. / Goody
 Noël Wells as Karen the Mermaid
 David Arquette as himself
 Haley Joel Osment as Gaston Lebone
 Richard "Cheech" Marin as Condor de Bogota

Guest
 Jackée Harry as Hog Queen ("Hog Hunt")
 Jamie-Lynn Sigler as herself ("Hog Hunt")

Episodes

Production

Development
On January 14, 2018, it was announced that Crackle was developing a new half-hour comedy series written and executive produced by Rob Riggle entitled Rob Riggle's Jet Ski Academy.

On March 29, 2018, it was announced that Crackle had given the show, now titled Rob Riggle's Ski Master Academy, a series order consisting of a first season of eight episodes. The show was created and written by Riggle who is also set to serve as an executive producer alongside Jonathan Stern, Keith Quinn, Bennett Webber, and Chris Pizzi. Production companies involved in the series include Sonar Entertainment and Abominable Pictures. On July 10, 2018, it was announced that the series would premiere on August 23, 2018.

Casting
Alongside the series order announcement, it was confirmed that the main cast would include Riggle, Billy Merritt, Britt Baron, Eliza Coupe, Dave (Gruber) Allen, Alison Rich, Carl Tart, Samm Levine, and Rizwan Manji. On July 10, 2018, it was announced that Dermot Mulroney, Christopher McDonald, Noël Wells, David Arquette, Jamie-Lynn Sigler, Jamie Chung, and Haley Joel Osment would guest star in the series.

Filming
Principal photography for the first season took place in Malibu, California.

Release
On July 27, 2018, the first trailer for the series was released.

Reception
In a positive review, Deciders Joel Keller praised the series saying, "Rob Riggle’s Ski Master Academy is a loopy combination of self-awareness, improv craziness, and meta metaness. Does it work all the time? No. But there’s a reason why shows of this ilk, starring Riggle, Scheer, or any combination of their early-’00s UCB alumni buddies is usually good for a guffaw or two: these folks have been doing improv together for 20 years, and the chemistry and ease is always apparent when they perform together."

References

External links

2018 American television series debuts
2018 American television series endings
2010s American comedy television series
Crackle (streaming service) original programming
English-language television shows
Television series by Sony Pictures Television